The Imperial Society of Knights Bachelor was formed in 1908 in the United Kingdom and received royal recognition in 1912. Its patron was Queen Elizabeth II until her death in 2022. It is a registered charity and seeks to uphold and advise on the dignity and rights of Knights Bachelor and knighthood, and to register every duly authenticated knighthood.

Its charitable objectives include the relief of poverty, the advancement of education, support for hospitals, the elderly, and the needy. A particular objective is to assist Knights Bachelor to encourage and develop understanding and cooperation between the citizens of the Commonwealth of Nations.

In 1962, the society established its own chapel in the Priory Church of St Bartholomew the Great, Smithfield, London. In 2005, the chapel was moved to St Martin's Chapel in the crypt of St. Paul's Cathedral, London. The society's badge may be worn in the form of a brooch by wives and daughters of knights.

Publications
Periodically, the Society published lists of living recipients of awards, with the subtitle A list of the existing recipients of the honour of Knighthood together with a short account of the origin, objects and work of ... the society.

The editions published by the Society included the Order of General Precedence extant in England at the time, so that the 1939–1946 edition (20th edition), and the subsequent 1949–1950 (21st edition), indicated pre-war and post-war precedence.

List of Knights Principal
 The Rt Hon Sir Bargrave Deane (1908–1911)
 Major-General Sir Henry Mill Pellatt, CVO (1911–1923)
 The Rt Hon Sir William Bull, Bt, MP (1923–1931)
 Commander Sir Arthur Trevor Dawson, Bt (1931)
 Sir Gerald Wollaston, KCB, KCVO (1931–1957)
 The Hon Sir George Bellew, KCB, KCVO, KStJ (1957–1962)
 Sir Anthony Wagner, KCB, KCVO (1962–1983)
 Sir Colin Cole, KCB, KCVO, TD (1983–1995)
 Sir Conrad Swan, KCVO (1995–2000)
 Sir Richard Gaskell (2000–2006)
 The Lord Lingfield, DL (2006–2012)
 Sir Colin Berry (2012–2019)
 The Rt. Hon Sir Gary Hickinbottom (2019-present)

List of Registrars
 Sir William Bull, Bt (1907–1920)
 Sir Harry North (1920–1921)
 Sir Park Goff, Bt, KC (1921–1939)
 Sir Malcolm Fraser, Bt, GBE (1939–1941)
 Sir Edwin Lutyens, OM, KCIE (1941–1944)
 Sir Thomas Lumley-Smith, DSO (1944–1960)
 Sir John Russell (1960–1978)
 Sir Arthur Driver (1978–1986)
 Sir Roger Falk, OBE (1986–1991)
 Sir Kenneth Newman, GBE, KStJ, QPM (1991–1998)
 Sir Robert Balchin, DL (1998–2006)
 Alderman Sir Paul Judge (2006-2012)
 His Honour Sir Gavyn Arthur (2012-2016)
 Sir Jeremy Elwes,  (2016-2017)
 Sir Michael Hirst (2017-present)

Arms

See also
Orders, decorations, and medals of the United Kingdom
Heraldry

Notes

External links
 Official website

1908 establishments in the United Kingdom
Charities based in London
British knights